Drumquin (Irish: Droim Caoin (Pleasant ridge).) is a small village and townland (of 398 acres) in County Tyrone, Northern Ireland. It lies between Omagh and Castlederg, on the banks of the Drumquin River (Fairywater). It is situated in the civil parish of Longfield West and the historic barony of Omagh West. It had a population of 291 people in the 2001 Census.

History

It has a rich and varied historical legacy with a Neolithic stone circle, a Holy Well, and the Giant's Stone on Dooish Mountain. 
The works of the noted Irish writer Benedict Kiely contain many references to the Drumquin district, with which he had family connections on his mother's side. In 1802, the countryside around Drumquin was described as one continuous scene of dreary mountains. However, the traveler did point out that forty years before that a rich coalmine had been opened at Drumquin and a canal opened to transport the coal. Drum quin has been in existence since 1211.

Sir John Davies founded the village itself in 1617, and the same gentleman built Castle Curlews, later called Castle Kirlish, the remains of which can be seen in the town land of that name. His agent was a man called Bradley, one of whose family was responsible in later times for the building of the fine stone house, which is a feature of the village today. Castle Kirlish was joined to Castlederg Castle by a straight causeway, which was seven miles (11 km) long. Traces of this causeway could still be observed in 1837.

Drumquin was also a staging town in the 19th and early 20th century for coaches and travellers who were making their way to Derry from Omagh and vice versa. As a result of this the village flourished and hosted a hotel and several shops. Felix Kearney immortalised this area with songs such as "The Hills Above Drumquin" and others. On 26 August 1920, during the Irish War of Independence, the Irish Republican Army (IRA) attacked the Royal Irish Constabulary (RIC) barracks in Drumquin. One RIC constable and one IRA volunteer were killed.

Geography

The geography of the area is a mixture of flat fertile lands that clings to the banks of the Fairywater and steep rolling hills. There are also forests to the southwest of the village. Lough Bradan is also located roughly 7 miles from the village. The land is also covered in numerous rivers and streams, and two rivers meet on the outskirts of the village to form the river Fairywater.

The village itself is dominated by Dooish Mountain which is the highest point in the area. Close to the village Sloughan Glen Waterfalls can be found; these rest in a deep ravine. Beyond the townland of Bradan lies miles of wet bogland that stretch to the border with County Fermanagh. In the area of the glen the land rises dramatically before falling again into the Fermanagh countryside. The area in general is also dotted with several quarries, the biggest of these lying 2 miles outside of the village itself.

Places of interest
Lough Bradan is located roughly 7 miles from the village, and is used as a fishing location and regularly stocked with trout. The area around the lough also has a number of walking trails. 
Sloughan Glen Waterfalls are located roughly 4 miles from the village. The waterfalls themselves lie in a deep ravine and can be accessed by a series of walkways and steps. 
The stone monument on Dooish Mountain was built in order to mark the turn of the Millennium, and construction started on 14 September 1999 and was completed on 4 May 2000. The monument itself was built using traditional methods, with no modern tools or equipment used. It is accessed via a mountain walk from either east or west face of the mountain. From the top of the mountain itself there are views of the village of Drumquin and the surrounding countryside.

Sport
Drumquin Wolfe Tones is the local Gaelic Athletic Association (GAA) club which has been in existence in its current form since 1968. Previous clubs have existed in various forms from the early 1930s. 
Drumquin also have a soccer team, Drumquin United, that has been in operation since 2007. The U-13 team won the Grade 4 league final in 2012.
Drumquin plays host to several stages of the World Rally Championship as part of Rally Ireland and has successfully hosted two such races in recent years.
Drumquin Rovers were a football team that run between 2000 and 2006 under the tutelage of Jason Thompson and Nuala Donnelly.

Demography

19th century population
The population of the village decreased during the 19th century:

2011 Census
On Census day in 2011:
71.3% were from a Catholic background and 26.6% were from a Protestant background.

Drumquin townland
The townland is situated in the historic barony of Omagh West and the civil parish of Longfield West and covers an area of 398 acres. The population of the townland declined during the 19th century:

The village of Drumquin is partly in the townland of the same name, and partly in townland of Drumnaforbe in the civil parish of Longfield East. In 1891 the village was estimated to cover an area of 12 acres.

Notable Drumquin Residents

See also
List of townlands of County Tyrone

Twin towns 
Llantrisant has a twinning arrangement with:
 Pont-Remy, France, since 1999.

References

Villages in County Tyrone
Townlands of County Tyrone
Civil parish of Longfield West